Pedro Fernández de Valenzuela may refer to:

 Pedro Fernández de Valenzuela (conquistador) (active 1536–1538), Cordobese conquistador who took part in the Spanish conquest of the Muisca and died in Córdoba, Spain
  (died 1572), Cordobese first rector of the University of Lima who traveled to the Viceroyalty of Peru and died in Lima